These are the Billboard magazine Dance/Mix Show Airplay number-one hits of 2012.

Note that Billboard publishes charts with an issue date approximately 7–10 days in advance.

See also
2012 in music
List of number-one dance singles of 2012 (U.S.)

References

2012
United States Dance Airplay